The Rhodesia Railways 16A class, later Zambia Railways and National Railways of Zimbabwe 16A classes.

Design
The 16A class were, as might be excepted, a modernised version of the older 16th class. The design was thoroughly revised throughout and externally was notable for the "streamlined" tanks and bunkers, while the cab was widened to maximum possible below waistrail, with inwardly sloping panels above. Internally they had long travel, long lap, valve gear, roller bearings on pony truck axles, separate boxes on most, and higher boiler pressure. This latter gave them a tractive effort equal to the former 18th class, to which they were mechanically vastly superior.

Service

Rebuilding
In 1978 Rhodesia Railways began to rebuild its steam locomotive fleet. Between 1980 and 1983 the remaining Garratt locomotives were completely overhauled and had some modernisation, including the installation of roller bearings. The work was undertaken by private companies, especially the RESSCO works in Bulawayo.

References

"THE SMOKE THAT THUNDERS"A.E. DURRANT and published edition APG, 1997 >

External links

Steam locomotives of Rhodesia
Steam locomotives of Zimbabwe
Steam locomotives of Zambia
2-8-2+2-8-2 locomotives
Garratt locomotives
Beyer, Peacock locomotives
Cape gauge railway locomotives
Railway locomotives introduced in 1954